William Emery Sparrow (September 15, 1897 – February 2, 1965) was a Canadian professional ice hockey forward who played 8 games in the National Hockey League for the Boston Bruins during the 1924–25 season. He also played with the Regina Capitals, Edmonton Eskimos and Calgary Tigers in the Western Canada Hockey League.  As a professional player, he spelled his name Emory, and was commonly known by the nickname Spunk  Sparrow.

Before he appeared on the professional hockey scene, Sparrow won the Canadian amateur championship trophy Allan Cup in 1916 with the Winnipeg 61st Battalion.

Career statistics

Regular season and playoffs

Awards and achievements
 Allan Cup (1916)
PHL First All-Star Team (1927)

References

External links

1897 births
1965 deaths
Boston Bruins players
Calgary Tigers players
Canadian ice hockey right wingers
Edmonton Eskimos (ice hockey) players
Ice hockey people from Manitoba
Minneapolis Millers (AHA) players
Philadelphia Arrows players
Regina Capitals players
Winnipeg Hockey Club players